Moss Vale is a town in the Southern Highlands of New South Wales, Australia, in the Wingecarribee Shire. It is located on the Illawarra Highway, which connects to Wollongong and the Illawarra coast via Macquarie Pass.

Moss Vale has several heritage buildings. In the centre of the main street is Leighton Gardens. Moss Vale has undergone recent (2019) gentrification. It has become a hub for independent and creative businesses, including design stores, cafes, and bars. The town has a commercial district and a golf course, including a large parkland, Cecil Hoskins Nature Reserve.

History

The Moss Vale area was once occupied by the Gundangara people, though they had disappeared by the 1870s, partly due to the loss of their hunting land to European settlers. Governor Hunter sent a party led by ex-convict John Wilson to investigate the area in 1798.  Various others explored the area up to 1815, including John Warby, George Caley, Hamilton Hume and John Oxley. Hume, Charles Throsby and Joseph Wild explored the area west of Sutton Forest in 1817 and in 1818, together with James Meehan, they explored the area between Moss Vale and Jervis Bay. Governor Macquarie granted Throsby , known as Throsby Park, at Bong Bong, on the northeastern outskirts of Moss Vale and put him in charge of building the  Old Argyle Road from Sydney to Goulburn in 1819. This road was replaced in the 1830s by a more direct road via Berrima surveyed by Thomas Mitchell and most of the population of Bong Bong moved to Berrima.  The heritage-listed property of Throsby Park house was built about 1834, six years after Throsby's suicide.

The area, which was considered to be part of Sutton Forest, remained rural until the coming of the railway. Subdivision part of Throsby Park for the town of Moss Vale, named after Jemmy Moss, a herdsman at Throsby Park, commenced in 1864, in anticipation of the opening of Sutton Forest railway station in 1867 at the intersection with Old Argyle Road.  Governor Belmore rented Throsby Park from 1870 to 1872 to what is commonly believed to escape the summer heat of Sydney. The railway and the Robertson Land Acts encouraged denser settlement by selectors in the Southern Highlands and led to the growth of Moss Vale as a town.  In 1877 Sutton Forest railway station was renamed Moss Vale.

Climate
Moss Vale has an oceanic climate (Cfb) with warm summers and cool winters.

Heritage listings 
Moss Vale has a number of heritage-listed sites, including:
 Church Road: Throsby Park
 Main Southern railway: Moss Vale railway station
 Main Southern railway 146.037: Argyle Street railway bridge
 Oldbury Road: Oldbury Farm

Population
At the 2021 census, 9,310 people were living in Moss Vale.

According to the 2016 census of Population, there were 8,579 people in Moss Vale. Aboriginal and Torres Strait Islander people made up 2.6% of the population. 78.2% of people were born in Australia. The most common other countries of birth were England 4.4%, New Zealand 1.7% and China 1.5%. 87.2% of people only spoke English at home. Other languages spoken at home included Mandarin at 1.3%. The most common responses for religion were No Religion 25.8%, Anglican 24.9% and Catholic 22.1%.

Economy
Moss Vale holds a large part of the Southern Highlands Industry – as well as being a minor centre for agriculture, many light and medium industries are found in and around Moss Vale, including a James Hardie plant, a HarperCollins book distribution centre, and other manufacturing industries. Despite Moss Vale's prowess as an industrial centre, nearby Bowral is the commercial heart of the Southern Highlands. 

Moss Vale is believed to have fertile soil and good precipitation. Agricultural rural holdings in the area specialise in dairy herds, mainly Holstein Frisian, and there is an assortment of beef studs and sheep properties.

Council and safety
The Wingecarribee Shire Council Chambers are located at 68 Elizabeth Street, Moss Vale. They can be found online at:
Wingecarribee Shire Council Website
Wingecarribee Shire Council Facebook Page

The Southern Highlands Police Station, part of the Hume Police District is the main NSW Police Force Station serving the Southern Highlands (Wingecarribee Shire). It is located at 67 Elizabeth Street. Moss Vale has a New South Wales Rural Fire Service Brigade which is located at 49 Berrima Road. There is also a Fire and Rescue NSW Station which is located at 64 Elizabeth Street, Moss Vale which is across the road from the Police Station and just up from the Wingecarribee Shire Council Chambers.

Transport
Moss Vale station is the primary southern terminus of the Southern Highlands railway line. The line provides regular services from Moss Vale to southern Sydney, where a change of trains is generally required to access the city centre. Limited services continue south of Moss Vale to Goulburn. The station also has two Sydney to Melbourne services and two Melbourne to Sydney services a day. Moss Vale is the junction of the Unanderra – Moss Vale railway line to Wollongong, opened in 1932, but now only used by freight trains.

Television
Television is delivered from the Illawarra region with a transmitter based on Mount Gibraltar.

The Southern NSW Channels are:

ABC (with ABC News, ABC Comedy, ABC Me, ABC Kids)

SBS (with SBS Viceland, Food Network, NITV)

7 Moss Vale (with 7TWO, 7mate, 7flix, Racing.com & ishoptv) – Prime Television-Seven Network Affiliate

WIN Television (with ELEVEN, ONE, TVSN & Aspire TV, Gold & Gold 2) – Ten Network Affiliate

9Capital (with 9Go!, 9Gem, 9Life, SBN & Aspire) – Southern Cross Television-Nine Network Affiliate

School
Schools in Moss Vale:
 Moss Vale High School
 Moss Vale Public School
 St Paul's Catholic Primary School
 St Paul's International College
 Tudor House School

Churches
Churches in Moss Vale:
Connect Christian Church (AOG/ACC)
Moss Vale Jehovah's Witnesses Hall
Moss Vale Uniting Church in Australia
St Andrews Presbyterian Church
St John's Anglican Church
St Paul's Roman Catholic Church

Sport
Sporting teams in Moss Vale:
 Moss Vale Basketball
 Moss Vale Cricket Club
 Moss Vale Dragonflies Netball Club
 Moss Vale Dragons Rugby League Club
 Moss Vale Hockey Club
 Moss Vale Rifle Club
 Moss Vale Soccer Club (Highlands Soccer Association or HSA for short)

Notable residents
 Ann Carr-Boyd, composer and musicologist
 Tom Green, artist
 Tony Lockett, former AFL player for the Sydney Swans
 Steve Prestwich, drummer for popular Australian rock band, Cold Chisel
 Ray Stone, rugby league player

Notable former residents
Dr Frank Tidswell, microbiologist, and his wife Edith lived at Farnborough'' in the 1930s

References

External links

 
Towns of the Southern Highlands (New South Wales)